Hurricane Dora was the first tropical cyclone on record to make landfall over the Atlantic coast of North Florida at hurricane intensity. The sixth tropical storm and second hurricane of the 1964 season, Dora developed from a tropical wave near the coast of Senegal on August 28. After a reconnaissance aircraft flight on September 1, the depression was upgraded to Tropical Storm Dora. It then curved northeastward and continued to strengthen. By early on September 3, Dora became a Category 1 hurricane. Six hours later, the storm reached Category 2 intensity. Intensification slowed somewhat, though Dora became a Category 3 on September 5. Deepening further, the storm peaked as a Category 4 with maximum sustained winds of  early the following day. At 18:00 UTC on September 6, Dora weakened to a Category 3 hurricane, then a Category 2 hurricane while curving westward early the following day.

Later on September 7, Dora continued to maintain Category 2 intensity on approaching the east coast of Florida, Dora's motion became erratic, making a few cyclonic loops. Dora then briefly drifted over southwestern Georgia, until turned east-northeastward late the next day. Early on September 14, the storm re-emerged into the Atlantic Ocean near Cape Hatteras, North Carolina, and transitioned into an extratropical cyclone several hours later. The remnants of Dora moved rapidly northeastward and dissipated offshore Newfoundland early on September 16.

Strong winds lashed North Florida, with sustained wind of  observed in St. Augustine. In Jacksonville, approximately 156,000 customers were left without electricity, while about 19% of phones in Duval County were out of service. Much of the damage in the Jacksonville area occurred to older buildings and those located in coastal areas. Additionally, sections of the city experienced wind-induced river flooding in the vicinity of the St. Johns River. Heavy rainfall damaged many unharvested crops and inundated numerous of roads and bridges, isolated some communities for several days. Throughout Florida, 74 dwellings were flattened and 9,374 received damage, while 14 mobile homes were destroyed and 218 others suffered severe impact. About 50 farm buildings and 423 small businesses were severely damaged or demolished. Three deaths and at least $230 million in damage occurred. In Georgia, the storm damaged about 1,135 homes and obliterated five others. Additionally, 18 trailers suffered major impact, while 43 small businesses were destroyed or experienced severe damage. There was one death in the state and at least $9 million in damage. A few other states were affected by the storm, though impact there was much lesser. One death occurred in Virginia. Overall, Dora caused $280 million in damage, which is equivalent to $2.6 billion in 2022 USD, and five deaths.

Meteorological history

Hurricane Dora was first identified as a broad area of low pressure on August 28, 1964, as it moved off the west coast of Africa into the Atlantic Ocean near Dakar, Senegal. Traveling west-southwestward, the system brushed the Cape Verde Islands on the next day. By August 31, images from the eighth Television Infrared Observation Satellite (TIROS VIII) depicted a developing storm with a central dense overcast, banding features and cirrus outflow. On September 1, reconnaissance aircraft flew into the system and determined that it had already become a tropical storm, with sustained winds reaching . Shortly thereafter, the first advisory was issued on Tropical Storm Dora and the center was estimated to be roughly 850 mi (1,370 km) east of Trinidad.

Upon being classified on September 1, Dora turned towards the northwest and intensified. Several reconnaissance missions into the storm indicated that it attained hurricane status during the afternoon of September 2; however, in the official Atlantic hurricane database, it is not listed as reaching this intensity until the nighttime hours. Increasing in size and strength, Dora attained winds of  early on September 3, the equivalent of a Category 2 on the modern-day Saffir–Simpson hurricane scale. At the time, meteorologists expected the storm to maintain a northwesterly course and be steered over open waters by a trough associated with Hurricane Cleo to the west. However, Dora "missed" the trough and gradually turned towards the west on September 6.

While executing the turn, Dora steadily weakened as its low-level inflow was disrupted. Tracking westward towards Florida, Dora's forward movement decreased and became erratic as it neared the coast. Early on September 9, the storm abruptly turned southeastward before moving north for several hours. Throughout the remainder of September 9, the hurricane executed three distinct cyclonic loops while maintaining a general westward motion. During the afternoon hours, Dora passed over the Gulf Stream, resulting in its central pressure decreasing 9 mbar (hPa) in a few hours.

Around 12:20 a.m. Although estimated to have been a Category 3 at landfall, the highest winds onshore were believed to have been in the Category 2 range. Striking northeastern Florida, Dora became the first tropical cyclone on record to make landfall in the region. Once onshore the storm gradually weakened, losing hurricane status about 24 hours later, and began a gradual turn towards the northeast. During the morning of September 12, Dora became almost stationary over the southern border between Alabama and Georgia. However, the storm rapidly accelerated and re-emerged into the Atlantic Ocean on September 14 near the Outer Banks of North Carolina. Hours after moving over water, the system transitioned into an extratropical cyclone. The remnants of Dora were last mentioned on September 16 off the northeast coast of Newfoundland.

Preparations

Caribbean
Upon Dora's classification on September 1, a small craft advisory was issued for the Leeward Islands and the northern Windward Islands.

United States
As Dora approached Florida, gale warnings were issued for the northeast section of the coastline. As Dora moved inland, gale warnings were issued from Sarasota to Pensacola. In addition, small craft for much of the Gulf Coast to the west coast of Florida, and later in the Mid-Atlantic were advised to remain in port until the storm subsided.

Impact
Overall, Hurricane Dora was responsible for five deaths and $280 million in damage, much of which occurred in Florida.

Bahamas and Florida

In the Bahamas, Dora brought heavy rains and high winds to Nassau. Residents were forced to evacuate their homes. Strong winds lashed northeastern Florida, with sustained wind of  observed in St. Augustine. Many locations north of Daytona Beach received sustained winds of at least . Because of the slow movement of Dora, some places experienced the worst of the storm for as much as 24 hours. Many areas of North Florida received at least  of rainfall, damaging many unharvested crops and inundating numerous roads and bridges, which isolated some communities for several days. Throughout Florida, 74 dwellings were flattened and 9,374 received damage, while 14 mobile homes were destroyed and 218 others suffered severe impact. About 50 farm buildings and 423 small businesses were severely damaged or demolished.

First Coast
Jacksonville was one of the most severely impacted cities. Approximately 156,000 customers were left without electricity, while about 19% of phones in Duval County were out of service. The power supply for Jacksonville and surrounding towns was lost for six days. Much of the damage in the Jacksonville area occurred to older buildings and those located in coastal areas. Additionally, sections of the city experienced wind-induced river flooding in the vicinity of the St. Johns River. Along the coast, Atlantic Beach and Jacksonville Beach were lashed by storm surge, which flooded low-lying areas and swept away houses and roads. Three homes were destroyed and 3,992 suffered damage, while 5 mobile homes were demolished and 25 experienced impact, overall in Duval County. 

The storm was also one of the factors that nearly led to the cancellation of a Beatles concert at Gator Bowl Stadium in Jacksonville on September 11; other reasons included that the Beatles would not perform with a segregated audience, the American Guild of Variety Artists forced the Fab Four to pay union dues, and that a group of filmmakers attempted to create bootleg footage of the concert. Those issues were eventually resolved. Initially, the Beatles planned to fly to Jacksonville after their concert in Montreal on September 8, but the storm forced their plane to be diverted to Key West. Just hours before the concert began, the Beatles arrived at Imeson Field. More than 20,000 fans attended the concert, though thousands of others could not attend due to power outages in the city.

In American Beach, which was once an African-American beach community established by Abraham Lincoln Lewis, many of its historical buildings were damaged or destroyed. Additionally, several homes and businesses were also affected or demolished. Some homes were swept away in Fernandina Beach, while the foundations of several other dwellings were threatened. Approximately 40 residences were damaged or destroyed. At Fort Clinch, located near the northern tip of Amelia Island, the exterior of the fort was severely impacted by erosion. Throughout Nassau County, Dora destroyed about 50 homes and damaged 500 others, while 25 small businesses were either demolished or suffered major impact.

In St. Johns County, 14 beach homes and 2 car garages were destroyed by erosion between Vilano Beach and southern Ponte Vedra Beach. A number of other dwellings were damaged. Waves inundated many areas of St. Augustine with a few inches to as much as several feet of water. The heaviest impact occurred at the bay front, in Davis Shores, and along the San Sebastian River. At Slave Market Square, floodwaters were "hip deep", while floodwaters outside the Monson Motor Lodge was described as "hubcap deep". Additionally, Castillo de San Marcos was surrounded by water. Winds unroofed some homes and downed giant, centuries old oak trees. Much of the city was left without electricity. Damage in St. Augustine totaled about $5 million. The pier and boardwalk at St. Augustine Beach were majorly damaged, as well as a section of State Road A1A, causing it to be closed to traffic. Approximately 1,027 homes and 19 others were destroyed, while 20 businesses suffered major losses or were demolished in St. Johns County alone.

High tides were also reported Flagler County, especially at Flagler Beach. About half of the municipal pier was destroyed, with some of its debris scattered over State Road A1A. In addition to the debris, washouts forced the road to be temporarily closed. Impact to private property was mainly limited to lost shingles, flooded yards, and a few downed trees. Seedling cabbage plants may have been completely ruined. Damage in the county was minor, reaching approximately $500,000. Tides of about  along the St. Johns River in Palatka threatened to wash away the eastern side of the memorial bridge. Extensive erosion occurred elsewhere in Putnam County along the river. A  yacht was beached at a county commissioner's riverfront home. Then-State Road 309 was flooded in the vicinity of Georgetown. Some trees were downed and a few classrooms suffered water leaks at St. Johns River Junior College in Palatka, but damage overall was minor. Approximately 1,800 people were left without telephone service in Palatka, Pomona Park, and Welaka.

Interior North Florida and Florida Panhandle

A few blocks were closed in the city due to flooding. One lane along Route 441 was inundated at Orange Lake. Throughout Marion County, 15 to 20 county roads were submerged. Additionally, Interstate 75 was flooded between Route 27 and County Road 318, resulting in the closure of that section of the highway. The storm inflicted minor damage on 18 homes and severe impacts on 8 others residences in Marion County.

Farther north, in Gainesville, "scores" of dwellings and 25 homes at Highland Court Manor and Lincoln Estates were invaded by water. Several residences on Northwest 10th Avenue were also flooded,In Gainesville, Florida, Hogtown Creek flooded and many homes in surrounding neighborhoods, including Woodland Terrace and Gold Club Manor experienced flooding that lasted for days. Along with the flooding, power was lost for a long while. while another 25 dwellings experienced water damage in High Springs after the Santa Fe River overflowed. A trailer park on Archer Road was inundated waist-deep. At Clear Lake, several homes were threatened by the rising body of water. A  fuel tank at Stengel Field emerged from the ground due to saturation. At the University of Florida, the half-basements of Anderson, Flint, Matherly, and Tigert halls were flooded, though classes remained in session while crews pumped out the water. Throughout the city, saturation downed trees, some of which fell on power lines, roads, and houses. Damage in Gainesville alone exceeded $300,000. Overall, 225 dwellings and 36 mobile homes in Alachua County were impacted, while 4 businesses received major damage or were destroyed.

At Live Oak,  of precipitation was observed over the course of four days. Flooding left the town almost completely isolated, with all highways leading into Live Oak closed. Some homes floated away, while others were flooded with water above the second story window. In a few neighborhoods, only the tops of the chimneys were visible. Many residents were stranded on their rooftops and required rescue by boats. One person died directly as a result of the storm from a drowning in Live Oak. Throughout Suwannee County, 100 homes suffered major damage, while 219 other dwellings were dealt minor impairments and 5 mobile homes received severe impacts. Additionally, seven farm buildings were extensively damaged and 80 small businesses suffered either destruction or significant effects.

Many roads were flooded in Lafayette County, including U.S. Route 27 and State Road 51, causing school to be canceled for several days. Much of the town of Mayo was inundated. Thirteen homes were damaged in the county, while four mobile homes received major impacts. In Madison County, 18 homes were inflicted minor damage.

In Taylor County, the city of Perry was flooded, with water entering more than 100 homes. Farther south, Steinhatchee was effected by freshwater flooding and storm surge. High water left State Road 51 – the only highway to and from Steinhatchee – closed for a few days. Throughout Taylor County, the storm damaged 300 homes to some degree, 25 severely. A total of 30 mobile homes suffered major impact. Additionally, 10 small businesses and 30 boats experienced major damage or were demolished.

Central Florida southward
In New Smyrna Beach, two concrete decks at the beach were swept away. Strong winds downed power lines and trees, which struck six homes. One house burned down in Glenwood, a community between DeLeon Springs and DeLand, after the owner forgot to extinguish a kerosene lantern before falling asleep. In DeLand, winds uprooted many trees and caused power and telephone service outages. The winds and rainfall ranging from  caused some losses of oranges and grapefruits. A total of 5 homes experienced significant damage in Orange City, while 8 other suffered light impacts. In western Volusia County, one dwelling was destroyed and twenty-nine suffered major impact, while one hundred twenty-seven homes experienced minor damage. Additionally, 15 trailers were significantly impacted. The hurricane destroyed 1 home, caused major damage to 19 homes, and inflicted minor damage to 397 homes in eastern Volusia County. Also in that section of the county, 5 mobile homes experienced substantial damage and 12 boats were either destroyed or severely damaged.

In Seminole County, wind damage was mainly limited a to downed power lines, electrical poles, and trees, some of which fell on homes and blocked streets, particularly in Altamonte Springs, Geneva, and Sanford. Two deaths occurred on September 9 when a helicopter being evacuated from the storm crashed near Sanford, killing two Navy personnel. Throughout Seminole County, 461 homes suffered minor damage and 8 mobile homes received minor damage. Additionally, 26 farm buildings were severely damaged and 12 boats were either extensively damaged or destroyed. In Brevard County, the storm caused minor flood damage to homes in Titusville. A few power lines and telephone lines were downed by the wind. A loss of 10% of grapefruit crops and 2%–3% of oranges in the county. Throughout southern Brevard County, Dora caused major damage to 4 homes and minor damage to 24 others. The cyclone also destroyed 4 mobile homes and inflicted major damage to 14 others. Additionally, 10 small businesses were either demolished or received extensive damage. In Indian River County, a total of 45 homes suffered light damage. Winds in the area left some power outages and toppled a steel, concrete sign at a courthouse.

Elsewhere in North America

Some locations in Georgia also experienced hurricane-force winds and heavy rainfall from the storm, particularly in the southeastern portion of the state. Hundreds of trees were toppled, which downed trees and power lines, with some areas experiencing a near complete loss of electricity. Storm surge and higher tides resulted in erosion and coastal flooding. On Jekyll Island, two motels lost portions of their roofs and a ferris wheel was destroyed. Extensive erosion also occurred on the island. Damage on Jekyll Island was conservatively estimated at $1 million. At least five homes were swept away on St. Simons Island, while sections of the pier and seawall were demolished. The F.J. Torras Causeway, a bridge connecting Sea Island and St. Simons Island to Brunswick, was flooded.

In one section of the city, about 100 homes were deroofed, while 25 other homes in another section were severely damaged. An estimated 35%-40% of dwellings were damaged to some degree in Brunswick. Many trees, and power lines were downed, limiting communication between the islands and the mainland to radio networks. Portions of Route 17 south of Brunswick was washed out. One man drowned in the Little Satilla River near Brunswick while attempting to secure his boat. Glynn County suffered over $3.6 million in damage. Soil erosion caused by heavy rainfall in Waycross resulted in extensive damage to buildings and streets. Throughout Georgia, the storm structurally impacted about 1,135 homes and obliterated five others. Additionally, 18 trailers suffered major impact, while 43 small businesses were destroyed or experienced severe damage. Although many pastures were flooded, impact on agriculture was minor. Overall, the storm left at least $9 million in damage in Georgia.

A few other states were affected by the storm, though impact there was much lesser. One death occurred in Virginia.

In Newfoundland, over 100 ships sought shelter at the St. John's harbor.

Aftermath

Following the storm, President Lyndon Johnson toured the devastated area with Florida governor Farris Bryant, U.S. senators Spessard Holland and George Smathers, Jacksonville mayor and Democratic nominee for governor Haydon Burns. President Johnson also personally assessed the damage in coastal Georgia, including at Brunswick and St. Simons Island. In the flooded areas, the Red Cross delivered typhoid serum by helicopter.

The name "Dora" had replaced "Donna" on the hurricane lists, and it was retired from the Atlantic hurricane lists and replaced with "Dolly" for the 1968 season.

See also

 1898 Georgia hurricane
 List of Atlantic hurricanes
 List of retired Atlantic hurricane names
 List of Florida hurricanes (1950–1974)

References

External links

 NHC 1964 Preliminary Report on Dora
 Historic Images of Florida Hurricanes (State Archives of Florida)

Dora
Dora
Dora 1964
Dora 1964
Dora 1964
Dora 1964
1964 natural disasters in the United States